The SŽ series 664 (formerly JŽ series 664, subseries 100), nicknamed Reagan is a diesel locomotive operated by the Slovenian Railways (SŽ).

The locomotives are a GM-EMD design, assembled under license by Đuro Đaković in 1984.

History

They were designed by Electro-Motive Diesel from the USA as type G 26 HW-2 and assembled by Đuro Đaković in 1984 and 1985. The first two locomotives were taken over by ŽGP Ljubljana and put into regular operation on 5 November 1984. Eight locomotives were awarded for the towing section in Divača, and twelve for the Maribor draw. It is intended for towing heavy freight and passenger trains on non-electrified lines in Styria, Dolenjska, Istria and  The Isonzo Corridor. Traffic with them was carried out on the Pragersko-Hodoš line until its electrification, and during the restoration of the consequences of damage due to ice in 2014, also on the Ljubljana-Sežana line. Recently, they have also been operating on Croatian routes, rented from private companies. locomotives 664-111, 664-112, 664-101, 664-105, 664-106, 664-114 have been operating in Serbia since February 2021 on behalf of Serbia Cargo.

Subseries 100

It is an improved type of locomotive JŽ 664 - 0xx (G26C), which is in use in Croatia (today as HŽ 2062). Due to forced charging, they are more powerful, they have an added dynamic brake, an alternator is installed instead of the main generator, and power regulation is continuous.  An electric generator with a power of 375 kW / 1500 V is installed to heat up to 10 coaches, so they are also used for passenger traffic. Due to a single cabin, visibility on the line is reduced, so the train is doubled (driver with assistant).

References

External links 
SŽ 664 pictures

Diesel-electric locomotives of Slovenia
Electro-Motive Division locomotives
Đuro Đaković (company)
Standard gauge locomotives of Slovenia